Luis Alberto Padilla Ponce (born February 24, 1985), is a Mexican former footballer who plays as a midfielder.

Career

Club Necaxa
Padilla made his professional debut on 11 November 2006 against Veracruz.

References

External links
Ascenso MX profile

1985 births
Living people
Mexican footballers
Club Necaxa footballers
Dorados de Sinaloa footballers
Alebrijes de Oaxaca players
Liga MX players
Ascenso MX players
Footballers from Guadalajara, Jalisco
Association football midfielders